Kobata (written: 小畑 or 小幡) is a Japanese surname. Notable people with the surname include:

, Japanese volleyball player
, Japanese footballer

See also
Kobata Station, a railway station in Kobe, Hyōgo Prefecture, Japan

Japanese-language surnames